Davis is an unincorporated community south of Prince Albert, Saskatchewan, Canada. Davis was once a village but has since shrunk to a handful of houses. It is just northwest of the Muskoday First Nation and southeast of Prince Albert. Davis was named for Senator Thomas Osborne Davis a prominent Prince Albert merchant and Liberal Party member in the late nineteenth and early twentieth century. Davis is located in the Aspen parkland biome.

Education 

Most students go to Osborne School a few miles south of Davis.  High School students go to one of the high schools in Prince Albert.

An old one room school house still stands.  It even has an old fashioned school bell on it.

Further reading 
What's in a Name - The Story Behind Saskatchewan Place Names, Western Producer Prairie Books, E.T. Russell

External links 
 Map showing location of Davis

Unincorporated communities in Saskatchewan
Prince Albert No. 461, Saskatchewan
Division No. 15, Saskatchewan